Libertador (Spanish for "liberator") may refer to:

 Libertadores, the principal leaders of the Latin American wars of independence from Spain and Portugal
 Avenida del Libertador (Buenos Aires), a thoroughfare in Buenos Aires, Argentina
 Libertador Avenue,  avenue in Montevideo, Uruguay
 Libertador Building, a government building in Buenos Aires, Argentina
 Puerto Libertador, Colombia
 Dajabón Province, Dominican Republic, named "Libertador" between 1938 and 1961
 Copa Libertadores, a South American football competition
 The Liberator (film), a 2013 Spanish–Venezuelan film

See also
 El Libertador (disambiguation)
 Libertador Municipality (disambiguation)